The 2004 Men's Australian Hockey League was the 14th edition of the men's field hockey tournament. The tournament was held at the State Netball Hockey Centre in Melbourne, from 17 to 29 February 2004.

QLD Blades won the tournament for the third time after defeating the WA Thundersticks 4–1 in the final. VIC Vikings finished in third place after defeating NSW Panthers 4–1 in the third and fourth place playoff.

Participating teams

 Canberra Lakers
 NSW Panthers
 Territory Stingers
 QLD Blades
 Adelaide Hotshots
 Tassie Tigers
 VIC Vikings
 WA Thundersticks

Competition format
The 2004 Men's Australian Hockey League consisted of a single round robin format, followed by classification matches.

Teams from all 8 states and territories competed against one another throughout the pool stage. At the conclusion of the pool stage, the top four ranked teams progressed to the semi-finals, while the bottom four teams continued to the classification stage.

Point allocation
All matches had an outright result, meaning drawn matches were decided in either golden goal extra time, or a penalty shoot-out. Match points were as follows:

· 3 points for a win
· 1 points to each team in the event of a draw
· 1 point will be awarded to the winner of the shoot-out
· 0 points to the loser of the match

Results
All times are local (AEDT).

Preliminary round

Standings

Fixtures

Classification round

Crossover

Seventh and eighth place

Fifth and sixth place

Medal round

Semi-finals

Bronze medal match

Gold medal match

Final standings

References

External links
Hockey Australia

Australian Hockey League